Rodney Govinden (born 13 September 1984) is a Seychellois sailor. He competed at the 2016 Summer Olympics in the men's Laser event, in which he placed 45th. He was the flag-bearer for Seychells at the 2016 Summer Olympics Parade of Nations.

He has qualified to represent Seychelles at the 2020 Summer Olympics in the men's Laser event.

References

External links
 
 
 

1984 births
Living people
Seychellois male sailors (sport)
Olympic sailors of Seychelles
Sailors at the 2016 Summer Olympics – Laser
Sailors at the 2020 Summer Olympics – Laser
African Games bronze medalists for Seychelles
African Games medalists in sailing
Competitors at the 2011 All-Africa Games